Cityliner or CityLiner may refer to:

 Cityliner (train), a limited express train service in Japan
 Cityliner (bus), the brand name for local buses in Malaysia operated by Konsortium Transnasional
 Alitalia CityLiner, a short-haul airline in Italy, a subsidiary of Alitalia
 Neoplan Cityliner, the name of several models of coach manufactured by German company Neoplan
 Cityliner, a model of coach manufactured by American company FitzJohn

See also
 City Line